Osteomugil is a genus of mugilid mullets found in coastal waters of the Indo-Pacific, including estuaries and rivers. They were formerly included in Moolgarda and Valamugil.

Species
There are currently five recognized species in this genus:
 Osteomugil cunnesius (Valenciennes, 1836) (Longarm mullet)
 Osteomugil formosae (Oshima, 1922)
 Osteomugil engeli (Bleeker, 1858) (Kanda)
 Osteomugil perusii (Valenciennes, 1836)  (Longfinned mullet)
 Osteomugil robustus (Günther, 1861) (Robust mullet)
 Osteomugil speigleri (Bleeker, 1858) (Speigler's mullet)

References 

Mugilidae